The Jaʿfarī school, also Jafarite school, Jaʿfarī fiqh or Ja'fari jurisprudence, is the school of jurisprudence (fiqh) in Twelver and Ismaili (including Nizari) Shia Islam, named after the sixth Imam, Ja'far al-Sadiq. In Iran, Jaʽfari jurisprudence is enshrined in the constitution.

It differs from the predominant madhhabs of Sunni jurisprudence in its reliance on ijtihad, as well as on matters of inheritance, religious taxes, commerce, personal status, and the allowing of temporary marriage or mutʿa. Since 1959, Jaʿfari jurisprudence has been afforded the status of "fifth school" along with the four Sunni schools by Azhar University. In addition, it is one of the eight recognized madhhabs listed in the Amman Message of 2004 by the Jordanian monarch, and since endorsed by Sadiq al-Mahdi, former Prime Minister of Sudan.

Branches

Usuli

This school of thought utilizes ijtihad by adopting reasoned argumentation in finding the laws of Islam. Usulis emphasize the role of Mujtahid who was capable of independently interpreting the sacred sources as an intermediary of the Hidden Imamas and thus serves the community as a guide. This meant that legal interpretations were kept flexible to take account of changing conditions and the dynamics of the times. This school of thought is predominant among most Shia.

Ayatollah Ruhollah Khomeini emphasized that Ja'fari jurisprudence is configured based on the recognition that epistemology is influenced by subjectivity. Accordingly, Ja'fari jurisprudence asserts Conventional Fiqh (objective) and Dynamic Fiqh (subjective). Through Dynamic Fiqh, discussed in the famous text by Javaher-al-Kalem, one must consider the concept of time, era, and age as well as the concept of place, location and venue since these dimensions of thought and reality affect the process of interpreting, understanding and extracting meaning from the commandments.

Akhbari

This school of thought takes a restrictive approach to ijtihad. This school has almost died out now; very few followers are left. Some neo-Akhbaris have emerged in the Indian subcontinent, but they do not belong to the old Akhbari movement of Bahrain.

See also
 Jafari (disambiguation)
 Bada'

Many contemporary Twelvers are described as rejecting predestination.  This belief is further emphasized by the Shia concept of Bada’, which states that God has not set a definite course for human history. Instead, God may alter the course of human history as is seen to be fit (Although some academics insist that Bada' is not rejection of predestination.).

 Nikah Mut'ah

Nikah mutʿah," is a type of marriage used in Twelver Shia Islam, where the duration of the marriage and the dower must be specified and agreed upon in advance. It is a private contract made in a verbal or written format. A declaration of the intent to marry and an acceptance of the terms are required (as they are in nikah). Zaidi Shias, Ismaili Shias, and Sunni Muslims do not practice nikah mut'ah.

 Taqiyah

In Shia Islam, taqiya ( /) is a form of religious veil, or a legal dispensation whereby a believing individual can deny his faith or commit otherwise illegal or blasphemous acts, specially while they are in fear or at risk of significant persecution. One source for this understanding comes from al-Kafi.

This practice was emphasized in Shi'a Islam whereby adherents may conceal their religion when they are under threat, persecution, or compulsion. 
Taqiyya was developed to protect Shi'as who were usually in minority and under pressure, 
and Shia Muslims as the persecuted minority have taken recourse to dissimulation from the time of the mihna
(persecution) under Al-Ma'mun in the 9th century, while the politically dominant Sunnites rarely found it necessary to resort to dissimulation.

See also

 Outline of Islam
Shia clergy
 The four schools of Sunni jurisprudence
 Hanafi
 Hanbali
 Maliki
 Shafi'i

Notes

References

Sources

External links

"Jafari: Shii Legal Thought and Jurisprudence" from Oxford Islamic Studies Online
Ja'fari Fiqh
Ja'fari School
Some of Shi'a Islamic Laws books
Islamic Laws of G.A. Sayyid Abulqasim al-Khoei
Islamic Laws of G.A. Fazel Lankarani
Islamic Laws of G.A. Syed Ali al-Husaini Seestani
Towards an Understanding of the Shiite Authoritative Sources

 
Twelver Shi'ism
Nizari Ismailism
Madhhab